is a platform game series created by Telenet Japan. A magical girl plot, the games tell the story of a Japanese schoolgirl who is fated to protect three realms by wielding a mystical sword known as Valis.

The original game, Valis: The Fantasm Soldier (1986), was developed for the PC-88 and ported to several other platforms. This was followed by a series of platform games released during the 16-bit era for various home consoles, most notably the TurboGrafx-16 and Sega Mega Drive. Outside the original series, an erotic visual novel was released in 2006, followed by compilations of the original games.

After Telenet Japan shut down in 2007, Sunsoft acquired the rights to the series. These rights were passed on to Japanese media company Edia in December 2019.

Games
All Valis games are platform games except Valis X, an erotic visual novel released for Windows in 2006 on the 20th anniversary of the series. Developed by Eants, it was the last game published by Telenet Japan. Valis X is divided into five episodes that retell the stories of the first four games, containing copious amounts of lesbian acts and tentacle erotica.

In June 2021, on the 35th anniversary of the Valis series, Edia announced a crowdfunding campaign to bring ports of the Valis games to the Nintendo Switch. A collection of the first three games, Valis: The Fantasm Soldier Collection was released in December 2021 in Japan and in March 2022 in Western territories.

In March 2022, Edia also announced the launch of a second collection of Valis that will feature Valis IV (PC Engine), Syd of Valis (Genesis / Mega Drive) and Valis: The Fantasm Soldier (Genesis / Mega Drive).

Manga
A four-volume Valis manga series by the artist ZOL was published by Kill Time Communication and featured in the seinen manga magazine Comic Valkyrie in 2007-2012. The first game had been separately adapted into a manga in 1999.

Notes

References

External links
Valis at Hardcore Gaming 101

Valis X
Official website (eants Inc.) 
Official website (bb5) 

 
LGBT-related video games
Video game franchises introduced in 1986
Video games featuring female protagonists
Magical girl video games
Seinen manga